Vladimír Balaš (born  20 April 1959) is a Czech politician, lawyer and university teacher. Since July 2022, he is the Minister of Education, Youth and Sports of the Czech Republic in the Cabinet of Petr Fiala.

References 

1959 births
Living people
People from Prostějov
Education ministers of the Czech Republic
Charles University alumni
Czech educators
Mayors and Independents Government ministers
Members of the Chamber of Deputies of the Czech Republic (2021–2025)
20th-century Czech lawyers